A pallet jack, also known as a pallet truck, pallet pump, pump truck, hand truck, scooter, dog, or jigger is a tool used to lift and move pallets.  Pallet jacks are the most basic form of a forklift and are intended to move pallets within a warehouse.

Operational principle 
The jack is steered by a 'tiller' like lever that also acts as the pump handle for raising the jack. A small handle on the tiller releases the hydraulic fluid, causing the forks to lower. 
The front wheels inside the end of the forks are mounted on levers attached to linkages that go to levers attached to the jack cylinder. As the hydraulic jack at the 'tiller' end is raised, the links force the wheels down, raising the forks vertically above the front wheels, raising the load upward until it clears the floor. The pallet is only lifted enough to clear the floor for subsequent travel. Oftentimes, pallet jacks are used to move and organize pallets inside a trailer, especially when there is no forklift truck access or availability.

A jack typically has steering wheels in the front, while each fork usually has either a single wheel or two bogie wheels.

History 
Manual pallet jacks have existed since at least 1918. Early types lifted the forks and load only by mechanical linkages. More modern type uses a hand pumped hydraulic jack to lift.

Types

Manual pallet jack
A manual pallet jack is a hand-powered jack most commonly seen in retail and personal warehousing operations. They are used predominantly for lifting, lowering and steering pallets from one place to another.

Powered pallet jack

Powered pallet jacks, also known as electric pallet trucks, walkies, single or double pallet jacks, or power jack, are motorized to allow lifting and moving of heavier and stacked pallets. Some contain a platform for the user to stand while moving pallets.  The powered pallet jack is generally moved by a throttle on the handle to move forward or in reverse and steered by swinging the handle in the intended direction.   Some contain a type of dead man's switch rather than a brake to stop the machine should the user need to stop quickly or leave the machine while it is in use. Others use a system known as "plugging" wherein the driver turns the throttle from forward to reverse (or vice versa) to slow and stop the machine, as the dead man's switch is used in emergencies only.

Rough terrain pallet jack
Rough terrain pallet jacks are designed specifically for use on uneven ground. They are made using heavy-duty frames and robust pneumatic tyres so that they can be manoeuvred over rough surfaces with ease. Many manufacturers opt for watertight wheel bearings, a hydraulic elevator or a built-in pump to ensure their rough terrain pallet jacks are easy and comfortable to use, even in the harshest conditions.

Operational limitations
 Reversible pallets cannot be used.
 Double-faced non-reversible pallets cannot have deck-boards where the front wheels extend to the floor.
 Enables only two-way entry into a four-way notched-stringer pallet, because the forks cannot be inserted into the notches.
 Power jacks have difficulty in confined spaces (coolers) and narrow openings.

Typical dimensions
Industry seems to have 'standardized' pallet jacks in several ways:
 Width of each of two Forks: 7" (17.78 cm)
 Fork Width, i.e. The dimension between the outer edges of the forks: Available as 20¼" (51.4 cm) and 27" (68.6 cm)
 Fork Length: Available as 36" (91.4 cm), 42" (106.7 cm), 48" (122 cm)
 Lowered Height: 2.9" (7.5 cm)
 Raised Height: At least 7.5" (19.1), but some will raise higher

In Eurasia the overall dimensions are similar, as modern container palletization has forced standardization in the dimensional domain globally.

See also
 Unit load

References

External links

 Tips for renting and working with pallet jacks
 OSHA hazards of working with pallet jacks

Freight transport
Lifting equipment
Material handling